The Banihal-Qazigund Railway Tunnel or Pir Panjal railway tunnel is an  long railway tunnel located in Pir Panjal Range of middle Himalayas in  Jammu and Kashmir, India, south of Qazigund town. It is a part of the Jammu–Baramulla line.

Length and elevation

There is a  road along the length of the tunnel for the maintenance of railway tracks and emergency relief. It takes approximately 9 minutes and 30 seconds for the train to cross the tunnel.

For a short time, Banihal-Qazigund Railway Tunnel was India's longest railway tunnel. Once completed, the 11.55 km long rail tunnel between Senapati and Imphal West districts on Jiribam–Imphal line will surpass the Pir Panjal Railway Tunnel as India's longest tunnel.

Progress of the project
The new  Banihal-Qazigund tunnel for the Jammu–Baramulla line connecting Bichleri Valley of Banihal with Qazigund area of Kashmir Valley has been constructed as a part of its Udhampur-Srinagar-Baramulla rail link project. The boring was completed in four years in October 2011, its lining and laying of rail tracks was completed in the next one year and trial run commenced on 28 December 2012. The tunnel was commissioned on 26 June 2013 and commercial runs started from 27 June 2013.

The railway network in Kashmir from Banihal to Baramulla is now . Until the  Katra-Banihal section of Jammu–Baramulla line gets constructed, people can travel from Jammu Tawi or Udhampur to Banihal by road and take the train from Banihal to Srinagar through the Banihal railway tunnel.

Gallery

See also
 Jammu–Baramulla line

References

External links
Pir Panjal Railway Tunnel T80 By N.A.T.M at IRICEN

Railway tunnels in India
Buildings and structures in Jammu and Kashmir
Rail transport in Jammu and Kashmir

2011 establishments in Jammu and Kashmir
Ramban district
Tunnels completed in 2013